Radio Mogadishu is the federal government-run radio station of Somalia.

History

Established during the colonial period in Italian Somaliland, Radio Mogadishu initially broadcast news items in both Somali and Italian. Transmissions in Somali at the station first began in 1957, concurrent with the start of Somali language programming in Radio Djibouti. Radio Mogadishu was modernized with Russian assistance following independence in 1960, and began offering home service in Somali, Amharic and Oromo.

After closing down operations due to the civil war that broke out in 1991, the station was officially re-opened in 23 August 2001 by the Transitional National Government of former President of Somalia Abdiqasim Salad Hassan. 

Prior to the Somali Army's ultimate pacification of the capital in August 2011, Radio Mogadishu operated from a walled compound guarded by armed soldiers. The station's staff routinely broadcast news, talk shows and music despite threats of violence.

Radio Mogadishu presently broadcasts from downtown Mogadishu. In the late 2000s, the station also launched a complementary website of the same name, with news items in Somali, Arabic and English. In 2013 Radio Mogadishu started the process of digitization of its archives, which dates back from 1951.

In October 2021 it was announced by the Somali Ministry of Information that programs in Italian would be broadcast again thanks to an agreement with the Italian embassy in Mogadishu.

From January 1, 2022, broadcasts in Italian begin, every day from 2.30 pm to 3.00 pm with a short news program, a musical program and various features.

Staff
Current
Abdiaziz M Guled Afrika, director
Abdilahi Qorshe, Chief Editor
Mohamed Kaafi Sheikh Abukar Editor of Planning 

Former
Mohamed Abshir Waldo, director
Sheik Nur Mohamed Abkey, reporter

See also
Media of Somalia
Radio Garowe
Radio Gaalkacyo
Shabelle Media Network
Somali National Television

References

External links

Radio Muqdisho.net

Radio stations in Somalia
Somali-language radio stations
English-language radio stations
Italian-language radio stations
Arabic-language radio stations
Mass media in Mogadishu
1943 establishments in Somalia